Mohamed Tindouft (born 12 March 1993) is a Moroccan runner specialising in the 3000 metres steeplechase. He represented his country at the 2017 World Championships without reaching the final. In addition, he won gold medals at the 2017 Islamic Solidarity Games and 2017 Jeux de la Francophonie.

He competed in the men's 3,000 metres steeplechase at the 2020 Summer Olympics.

International competitions

Personal bests

Outdoor
3000 metres – 7:38.92 (Chorzów 2021)
3000 metres steeplechase – 8:11.65	(Firenze 2021)

References

External links
 
 
 
 

1993 births
Living people
Moroccan male steeplechase runners
World Athletics Championships athletes for Morocco
Athletes (track and field) at the 2019 African Games
African Games competitors for Morocco
Athletes (track and field) at the 2018 Mediterranean Games
Athletes (track and field) at the 2022 Mediterranean Games
Mediterranean Games competitors for Morocco
Islamic Solidarity Games competitors for Morocco
Athletes (track and field) at the 2020 Summer Olympics
Olympic athletes of Morocco
Mediterranean Games silver medalists for Morocco
Mediterranean Games medalists in athletics
21st-century Moroccan people